Terry Colin Crabb (born 23 July 1976) is a former New Zealand cricketer. Crabb was a left-handed batsman who bowled left-arm medium pace.  He was born in Auckland, Auckland Region.

Crabb made his first-class debut for Auckland in the 1997/98 season against Canterbury.  It was during that season that he played his second and final first-class match against Northern Districts.  In those two first-class matches, he scored 49 runs at a batting average of 16.33, with a high score of 24.  Later, during the 2000/01 Shell Cup he made his List A debut for Auckland against Northern Districts.  Following the end of the New Zealand cricket season, Crabb played as Denmark's overseas player in the 2002 Cheltenham & Gloucester Trophy in English domestic cricket, playing a single match against Suffolk, in a match which was played in 2001.  The following New Zealand cricket season, he played his final two List A matches against Wellington and Otago.  Crabb played a total of 4 List A matches, during which he scored 9 runs at an average of 3.00, with a high score of 9. While with the ball he took 4 wickets at a bowling average of 27.00, with best figures of 2/19.

See also
 List of Auckland representative cricketers

References

External links
Terry Crabb at ESPNcricinfo
Terry Crabb at CricketArchive

1976 births
Living people
Cricketers from Auckland
New Zealand cricketers
Auckland cricketers
Denmark cricketers